The Amertec Building was an office building, located at 149 W 21st St, Hialeah, Florida.

History 
The building was designed by Chayo Frank, who received the task from his father, the owner of Amertec-Granada, Inc. Chayo was tasked with creating a space for his father's architectural woodworking and to house his fixture manufacturing business. The building was an example of what Frank called an "organic entity."

Some areas of the building stood completely in free-form, such as the water flumes on the exterior, and the curved rebar, which was used to form the large geometric shapes.

In 1981, the Amertec building was sold by Frank's father and was offered for sale several times until its foreclosure in 2011. The building was then repainted white from its original metallic color and sold to Produce LLC for $1,000,000. In 2013, the Amertec building was again repainted to include orange and aqua colors. Frank's father's business operated until it was sold in 2002. In later years, the building was painted white and used as storage for a produce company. The building was demolished in February 2017.

References 

Buildings and structures in Miami-Dade County, Florida
Demolished buildings and structures in Florida
Buildings and structures demolished in 2017